A hobcart was a type of mobility device designed in the late 1960s by Dr. Steven Perry of Albrighton, Shropshire, UK. In his practice he had two young children, both of whom had spina bifida. He considered that the wheelchairs the children were provided with were liable to set them apart from other children of their age, so set about designing a mobility device, that would look like a go-kart. The end result was the hobcart, which when it was first made, was produced at a local borstal. The idea behind this was to try to provide the inmates of the borstal the opportunity to be involved in a project which they could see was doing some good. Hobcarts were still being made into the 1980s.

See also
Invacar
Mobility scooter
Toy wagon
Invabus

References

External links
Entry in New Scientist Magazine on Hobcarts

Mobility devices
Human-powered vehicles
Wheelchairs